Marineros de Puerto Plata is a professional basketball team based in Puerto Plata, Dominican Republic. The team currently plays in Dominican top division Liga Nacional de Baloncesto.

References

Basketball teams established in 2005
Basketball teams in the Dominican Republic